Vattaru-uthuru Kandu is the channel between the tip of the Meemu Atoll Raiymandhoo 'Muli' and the reef of 'Fohtheufalhu' of the Maldives.

References
 Divehiraajjege Jōgrafīge Vanavaru. Muhammadu Ibrahim Lutfee. G.Sōsanī.

Channels of the Maldives
Channels of the Indian Ocean